George Gebbie (24 August, 1832, Sorn – 13 August, 1892, Philadelphia) was a Scottish American publisher who founded Gebbie and Company. George was born in Sorn, Ayrshire and by 1861 was living in London. He migrated to the United States in 1863, initially settling in Utica, New York. After a brief period in New York City he moved to  Philadelphia by March 1866. He married Mary Jane Fitzgerald. Following his death, his personal library was sold in November 1894.

References

1832 births
1892 deaths